IF Väster is a Swedish football club located in Västra Frölunda.

Background
Idrottsföreningen Väster is a football club from western Göteborg, with  Önnered being the main catchment area. The club was formed in 1973 and has over 1000 active members.  In addition to the men's and ladies teams the club runs an extensive youth section for boys and girls. In May 2010 IF Väster opened two new artificial turf pitches, one full size and the other 7-a-side. The most well known player who has represented IF Väster is Patrik Gustafson who played for Jonsereds IF and Örgryte IS before returning to his home club as a player and coach.

Since their foundation IF Väster has participated mainly in the middle and lower divisions of the Swedish football league system.  The club currently plays in Division 5 Göteborg which is the seventh tier of Swedish football. They play their home matches at the Önneredsplan in Västra Frölunda.

IF Väster are affiliated to Göteborgs Fotbollförbund.

Recent history
In recent seasons IF Väster have competed in the following divisions:

2011 – Division III, Nordvästra Götaland
2010 – Division III, Nordvästra Götaland
2009 – Division III, Sydvästra Götaland
2008 – Division III, Sydvästra Götaland
2007 – Division III, Nordvästra Götaland
2006 – Division III, Nordvästra Götaland
2005 – Division IV, Göteborg B
2004 – Division IV, Göteborg B
2003 – Division III, Nordvästra Götaland
2002 – Division III, Nordvästra Götaland
2001 – Division III, Nordvästra Götaland
2000 – Division III, Nordvästra Götaland
1999 – Division IV, Göteborg B
1998 – Division IV, Göteborg B
1997 – Division IV, Göteborg B
1996 – Division IV, Göteborg B
1995 – Division III, Sydvästra Götaland
1996 – Division IV, Göteborg B
1996 – Division IV, Göteborg A

Attendances

In recent seasons IF Väster have had the following average attendances:

Footnotes

External links
 IF Väster – Official website

Football clubs in Gothenburg
Association football clubs established in 1973
1973 establishments in Sweden
Football clubs in Västra Götaland County